The Narramissic River is a  river in Hancock County, Maine. It is the furthest downstream freshwater section in the Narramissic watershed.

The Narramissic begins at the outlet of Alamoosook Lake and flows west and southwest. It turns south at Duck Cove, just upstream of the village of Orland, where, near the end of Fish Point, at Lower Falls or "Orland" Dam, its overflow joins the tidal Orland River .

See also
List of rivers of Maine

References

Maine Streamflow Data from the USGS
Maine Watershed Data From Environmental Protection Agency

Tributaries of the Penobscot River
Rivers of Hancock County, Maine